Johnny Cornelius Ray (born March 1, 1957) is an American former second baseman and outfielder in Major League Baseball who had a 10-year career from 1981 to 1990. He played for the Pittsburgh Pirates of the National League and the California Angels of the American League. He also played two seasons for the Yakult Swallows in Japan in 1991 and 1992.

Biography
Ray played college baseball for the University of Arkansas, finishing up in the 1979 College World Series for the runner-up Razorbacks. Ray was selected by the Houston Astros in the 12th round of the amateur baseball draft. He was traded to the Pirates on August 31, 1981, along with Randy Niemann for Phil Garner.

Ray immediately became the Pirates' starting second baseman. As a rookie in 1982 he played in every game and was named the Rookie of the Year by The Sporting News, even though the Baseball Writers' Association of America selected Los Angeles Dodgers second baseman Steve Sax as the Rookie of the Year.

Besides, Ray continued his productive hitting, leading the league in doubles in 1983 and 1984. He then won the Silver Slugger Award for second baseman in 1983, and finished fifth in the league in batting average in 1984. By the time, the switch-hitting Ray was consistently one of the most difficult batters to strike out.

The Pirates, going with a youth movement, traded Ray to the Angels on August 29, 1987, for Miguel García and minor league prospect Bill Merrifield. García had a brief career in the major leagues while Merrifield never made it out of the minor leagues. Meanwhile, after narrowly missing making the All-Star team during a couple of seasons, Ray was finally chosen to the American League All-Star team in 1988.

Later in his career, Ray demonstrated his versatility by playing some games in left field. This career path has been followed by a few other second basemen, such as Alfonso Soriano.

After his career in the Major Leagues, Ray played for two seasons with the Yakult Swallows in Japan. Since retiring, Ray returned to Chouteau, Oklahoma, where he was born, raised and still lives. As a mark of distinction, one roadside sign outside the eastern Oklahoma town reads "Chouteau, OK. Home of Johnny Ray."

Career statistics

References

External links

Pelota Binaria (Venezuelan Winter League)

1957 births
Living people
African-American baseball players
American expatriate baseball players in Japan
American League All-Stars
Arkansas Razorbacks baseball players
Baseball players from Oklahoma
California Angels players
Cardenales de Lara players
American expatriate baseball players in Venezuela
Daytona Beach Astros players
Gulf Coast Astros players
Major League Baseball second basemen
Northeastern Oklahoma A&M College alumni
Northeastern Oklahoma A&M Golden Norsemen baseball players
People from Mayes County, Oklahoma
Pittsburgh Pirates players
Silver Slugger Award winners
Tucson Toros players
University of Arkansas alumni
Yakult Swallows players
21st-century African-American people
20th-century African-American sportspeople